The Boulder Hot Springs Hotel is a hotel on the National Register of Historic Places located southeast of Boulder, Montana.  It was added to the Register on January 12, 1979.

A  area historically associated with the hotel was listed.

The building is said to be haunted by "Simone", the ghost of a prostitute who was murdered at the hotel.

References

External links
Home page

Hotel buildings on the National Register of Historic Places in Montana
National Register of Historic Places in Jefferson County, Montana
Queen Anne architecture in Montana
Mission Revival architecture in Montana
Hotel buildings completed in 1883